Vasile Carauș (born 6 August 1988) is a Moldovan professional football player.

External links
 

1988 births
Living people
Moldovan footballers
Moldova international footballers
Moldovan expatriate footballers
Expatriate footballers in Romania
Expatriate footballers in Russia
Expatriate footballers in Ukraine
Moldovan expatriate sportspeople in Ukraine
FC Metalurh Zaporizhzhia players
Ukrainian Premier League players
Association football midfielders
PFC Spartak Nalchik players